"Good Lovin' is a song popularized by the Young Rascals in 1966.

Good Lovin' may also refer to:

 Good Lovin' (album), by David Campbell, 2008
 "Good Lovin (Alcazar song), 2014
 "Good Lovin (Benjamin Ingrosso song), 2017
 "Good Lovin (Jess Moskaluke song), 2013
 "Good Lovin" (Ludacris song), 2014
 "Good Lovin (Slim song), 2008
 "Good Lovin' (Makes It Right)", a song by Tammy Wynette, 1971

See also
 "Gimme Gimme Good Lovin', a song by Crazy Elephant, 1969